"Buy Me a Pony" is a song by Australian alternative rock band, Spiderbait and was released in September 1996 as the lead single from the band's third studio album Ivy and the Big Apples. "Buy Me a Pony" peaked at number 45 on the Australian chart.

Details
The track satirises the initial enthusiasm a label has for a band, and subsequent reversal, inspired in part by the bidding war that took place to sign Spiderbait. Kram said, "That song was kind of like a comic book version of how bad it can be, and the song still resonates with people today. But the label loved it, even though it was about them and everyone else - they had enough of a sense of humour to get it."

Reception
At the ARIA Music Awards of 1997, the song was nominated for Single of the Year, losing out to "Truly Madly Deeply" by Savage Garden.

The song ranked at number 1 on Triple J's Hottest 100 in 1996. It was the first song by an Australian artist to top the charts. Triple J Music Director Richard Kingsmill said, "After three years of doing year-specific Hottest 100s we were still sitting back waiting for an Australian song to reach number one, and we were thinking, 'Oh, it's still years away for a Hottest 100 song that's Australian'. But it wasn't!" It was also the shortest song to ever win.

Track listings

Charts

Release history

References

 

1996 singles
1996 songs
Spiderbait songs
Polydor Records singles
Song recordings produced by Phil McKellar